The SPG-82 (transliterated Russian: Stankovyi Protivotankovyi Granatomet - heavy antitank grenade launcher) was a Soviet wheeled antitank rocket launcher that entered service after the end of World War II. It was replaced in Soviet service by the B-10 recoilless rifle from 1954 but remained in service with some armies, notably in the Middle East until the 1970s. The SPG-82 was also carried by BRIMOB (the Indonesia Police Mobile Brigade) in 1963. It has been replaced by B-10 recoilless rifle.

Description
The weapon consists of a long barrel tube with a flared muzzle, supported by a simple carriage with two small solid wheels. A curved shoulder pad is attached to left side of the barrel, and a large shield is fitted to protect the crew from the back-blast produced by the rocket projectiles. The shield is not thick enough to provide protection from enemy fire. The weapon is normally fired from the carriage, but it can be dismounted and shoulder fired by two men working together to support the weapon.

The weapon fires two types of projectiles, a general purpose explosive/fragmentation round, the OG-82, and an armour piercing anti-tank round, the PG-82. It has two sets of iron sights corresponding to the two different rounds fired by the weapon. The HE sight is graduated out to 700 meters while the weapon's effective range for the HEAT round is around 200 meters.

Ammunition

Users

See also
 List of Russian weaponry
 SPG-9

Notes

References
 ORDATA database
 Brassey's Infantry Weapons of the World 1950-1975, J.I.H. Owen
 militaertechnik-der-nva.de SPG-82 page

Cold War anti-tank rockets of the Soviet Union
Recoilless rifles of the Soviet Union
Military equipment introduced in the 1950s